The arsenic (As) cycle is the biogeochemical cycle of natural and anthropogenic exchanges of arsenic terms through the atmosphere, lithosphere, pedosphere, hydrosphere, and biosphere. Although arsenic is naturally abundant in the Earth's crust, long-term exposure and high concentrations of arsenic can be detrimental to human health.

Reservoirs and fluxes

Lithosphere 
Arsenic's largest reservoir on Earth is the lithosphere. Earth's crust contains more than 200 mineral types containing As, including many sulfide minerals. Arsenic is abundant in ore deposits containing arsenopyrite (FeAsS) and tennantite. Sedimentary rocks bearing coal and shale may also contain high As. Major fluxes of As from the lithosphere to the atmosphere are volcanic emissions. 

Soil is the second largest global reservoir of As  Under oxic conditions, As is present in soils as arsenate (As(III)), which can bind to Fe(III) hydroxides. The speciation of As in soil depends on soil pH and other factors. Acidic soils may contain arsenate bound to aluminum and iron, while basic soils may contain calcium-bound arsenate. The residence time for As in soils depends on the climate type, ranging from 1,000 to 3,000 years for moderate climates.

Hydrosphere 
Freshwater and groundwaters commonly contain <1 ppb of As. The concentration of As is pH dependent; acidic conditions mobilize As at pH <5. Oxic seawater contains As(III) as arsenate (average of 1.7 ppb). Major sinks include sedimentation and subduction.

Biosphere 
Arsenic is naturally present in the biosphere, with highest concentration in plant roots. Terrestrial plants can contain up to 200 ppm (parts per million) As. Marine organisms (e.g. Annelida and Echinodermata) contain 6-8 ppm. The human body also contains trace As with highest concentrations in the kidneys and liver (up to ~1.5 ppm).

Anthropogenic emissions 
Human use arsenic in pesticides, wood preservatives, metal treatment, paint, and coal-based power plants. Anthropogenic residues and discharges from coal-based power plants, mining, and smelting can contaminate rivers, lakes, streams and soil. Anthropogenic As emissions originate from steel and glass production, and forest and grassland burning. In the atmosphere, As is mainly present in particulates such as dust, with a residence time of 7 to 10 days.

Arsenic toxicity 
Arsenic is a metalloid with an atomic number of 33, and its common oxidation states are +3 or +5, as arsenate(As III) and arsenite(As V). Arsenic is primarily found as organic arsenic compounds, inorganic arsenic compounds, and arsine gas. Arsenic toxicity is dependent on its oxidation state; As(III) is more toxic than As(V) because of its ability to bind to thiol groups on proteins and enzymes, and its slower excretion rate from the body. The World Health Organization recognizes that inorganic arsenic is extremely toxic for humans (EPA maximum of 10 ppb in water) and detrimental to aquatic life.

See also 

 Arsenic
 Arsenic poisoning

References 

Biogeochemical cycle
Arsenic